Chandos Clifford Hastings Mansel Morgan,  (12 August 1920 – 1 January 1993) was a Church of England priest and military chaplain. He was Chaplain of the Fleet and Archdeacon of the Royal Navy from 1972 to 1975.

Early life
Morgan was born on 12 August 1920. He was educated at Stowe School, then an all-boys private school in Stowe, Buckinghamshire. He studied at Jesus College, Cambridge.

Ordained ministry
Morgan was ordained in 1944. After a curacy at Holy Trinity, Tunbridge Wells he became a Naval Chaplain and served on (amongst others) HMS Pembroke, HMS Theseus, HMS Caledonia, HMS Ark Royal and HMS Collingwood before becoming head of the service as Chaplain of the Fleet.

On his retirement from the Royal Navy he was appointed chaplain of Dean Close School, Cheltenham, and subsequently Rector of St Margaret Lothbury by the Simeon Trust.

He died on 1 January 1993.

References

1920 births
People educated at Stowe School
Alumni of Jesus College, Cambridge
Chaplains of the Fleet
Companions of the Order of the Bath
1993 deaths